Collins Lake, previously known as Virginia Ranch Reservoir during its construction, is a freshwater man-made lake with  located in the foothills of the Sierra Nevada Mountains north of Sacramento, California.  The lake was originally created to provide additional irrigation water to Browns Valley and Loma Rica. It still serves that purpose as well as a recreation and fishing lake.

History

Collins Lake's founding organization, Browns Valley Irrigation District (BVID), was established in 1888. Demand for irrigation water in the area quickly exceeded availability. As early as 1919 BVID began exploring the idea of damming the water flowing through Virginia Ranch in order to satisfy Browns Valley and Loma Rica. Lack of funds for the five year, 1.36 million dollar project prevented it from being started. Virginia Ranch Dam was completed in 3 years, creating Collins Lake, named for Merle Collins who played a significant role in promoting the project.

In 1967 Pineland Development started a concession for recreation and camping on the lakefront.  Since 1972 the concession has been family run and has expanded to include 109 RV hookup campsites as well as tent camping sites.  The campground and day use areas are gated but open at dawn year round.

See also
 List of dams and reservoirs in California
 List of lakes in California

References

External links
Official Collins Lake Website
Brown Valley Irrigation District Website
California Data Exchange Rain Gauge at Collins Lake

Reservoirs in Yuba County, California
Reservoirs in California
Reservoirs in Northern California